The 2017 Winter Cup was an artistic gymnastics competition held at the Westgate Las Vegas in Las Vegas from February 16 to February 18, 2017.

Competition
The competition had junior and senior gymnasts competing in the same field. The finals session featured the top 42 gymnasts according to their all-around ranking and the top three gymnasts on each apparatus. The all-around and individual event champions were determined via a combined two-day score. Performances at the Winter Cup helped determine the 15 men who comprised the United States men's national gymnastics team at the 2017 U.S. National Gymnastics Championships.

Medalists

References

U.S. Winter Cup
Gymnastics
Winter Cup
Winter Cup
Winter Cup